The  Independent Republican Party (BCP) is a Kemalist political party defends republicanism and full independence in Turkey. It was founded by constitutional law professor Mümtaz Soysal and many academics on 24 July 2002.

References 

2002 establishments in Turkey
Kemalist political parties
Political parties established in 2002
Political parties in Turkey